Lyman Beecher Eaton (May 3, 1874 – December 1, 1897) was an American college football player and coach. He served as the head football coach at the University of Kentucky for one season in 1897. A four-year letter winner at the University of Cincinnati, Eaton arrived at Kentucky one day before their first game. The team, frustrated by a lack of practice time, protested for 10 days in the middle of the season.

Eaton left Kentucky after one dismal season with the intent of continuing his education at the Cincinnati medical college. On November 30, 1897, the second day of studies, he was severely injured trying to jump onto a streetcar on Main Street in Cincinnati. His right leg was broken and his hip dislocated. He was taken to the home of his mother in Hartwell, where he died from a blood clot the next day.

Head coaching record

References

External links
 

1874 births
1897 deaths
19th-century players of American football
Cincinnati Bearcats football players
Kentucky Wildcats football coaches
Road incident deaths in Ohio